Mexican Universal Chihuahua is a pageant in Chihuahua, Mexico, that selects that state's representative for the national Mexicana Universal pageant.

In 2005 was not sent to a State Representative.

The State Organization has produced one Nuestra Belleza México titleholder in 1995 with Vanessa Guzmán, she being the first and only woman from her state to win a crown of Nuestra Belleza México/Mexicana Universal.

Prior to "Mexicana Universal Chihuahua" some regional competitions are held within the State as:
Mexicana Universal Camargo
Mexicana Universal Cd. Chihuahua
Mexicana Universal Cuauhtémoc
Mexicana Universal Delicias
Mexicana Universal Cd. Juárez
Mexicana Universal Nuevo Casas Grandes
Mexicana Universal Parral
Mexicana Universal Rosales

Mexicana Universal Chihuahua is located at number 5 with a crown of Nuestra Belleza México.

Titleholders
Below are the names of the annual titleholders of Nuestra Belleza Chihuahua 1994-2016, Mexicana Universal Chihuahua 2017, and their final placements in the Mexicana Universal.

 Competed in Miss Universe.
 Competed in Miss International.
 Competed in Miss Charm International.
 Competed in Miss Continente Americano.
 Competed in Reina Hispanoamericana.
 Competed in Miss Orb International.
 Competed in Nuestra Latinoamericana Universal.

Designated Contestants
As of 2000, isn't uncommon for some States to have more than one delegate competing simultaneously in the national pageant. The following Nuestra Belleza Chihuahua contestants were invited to compete in Nuestra Belleza México.

External links
Official Website

Nuestra Belleza México